Bellagio is a private housing estate on reclaimed land along Castle Peak Road, Sham Tseng, New Territories, Hong Kong.

History
Formerly the site of the San Miguel Factory, the estate consists of three phases (Phase 1: Tower 6 to 9; Phase 2: Tower 2 and 5; Phase 3: Tower 1 and 3) completed between 2002 and 2006. It was jointly developed by Wheelock and Co. and its subsidiaries The Wharf (Holdings) and New Asia Realty (later known as Wheelock Properties).

Layout
Bellagio Tower 1-5 and 6-9, which stand as the 50th and 64th-tallest building in Hong Kong, are composed entirely of residential units. The biggest stakeholder of Bellagio currently is Ian so.

See also
List of tallest buildings in Hong Kong

References

Buildings and structures completed in 2006
Residential skyscrapers in Hong Kong
Private housing estates in Hong Kong
Sham Tseng
The Wharf (Holdings)
Wheelock and Company